Kirazlı is a neighbourhood in the İspir District of Erzurum Province in Turkey. In late 2021, it was subject to a storm that killed 4 people and injured 38 more, affecting ~87% of the living population. Higher officials were quickly subject to political outcry upon the disaster as they did not sufficiently warn the people of the storm.

References

Villages in İspir District